A Man and His Dog (also translated Bashan and I) is a 1918 narrative by Thomas Mann. It was written in the twilight of World War I and portrays an idealised and timeless world.

Writing and publication history

Writing and background 
Thomas Mann began writing A Man and His Dog on 18 March 1918 – immediately after he had completed his Reflections of a Nonpolitical Man and shortly before his sixth child Michael was born on 21 April 1918. He finished his work on the narrative on 14 October 1918. The short work – with the German subtitle An Idyll – was thus written in the final months of World War I. In his diary entry for 27 October 1918, Thomas Mann explained his reasons for writing the narrative in relation to the war:

Publication and translations 
The printing was illustrated by Emil Preetorius. The proceeds of this luxurious printing went to writers in need. It contained an introduction by Thomas Mann where he explained – with a hint of irony – that he only intended to write about the real life of his dog Bauschan and did not want to deal with societal or "higher" issues. He explained:

The first English translation was provided by Herman George Scheffauer. It was published in London by W. Collins and Sons and Co. under the title Bashan and I in 1923. The narrative was again translated by Helen Tracy Lowe-Porter under the new title A Man and His Dog and published in 1936 by Knopf in New York as a part of Stories of Three Decades.

Plot 
In A Man and His Dog Thomas Mann describes his experiences with his chicken-dog mongrel Bauschan (or, in English translations, Bashan) on the banks of the Brunnbach in Munich. In the narrative how the day turns out for the dog is decided in the moment his master leaves his garden. If the master turns left the day is lost for the dog, because he goes to town. But when the master turns right, a walk through nature and the hunting grounds will follow and both march on into a romanticised rural world. The narrative is structured into five chapters:

In the first chapter ("He Comes Round the Corner" [""]) the narrator and the chicken-dog are introduced. In the second chapter ("How We Got Bashan" [""]), it is described how the Manns got Bauschan. In the third chapter ("Notes on Bashan's Character and Manner of Life" [""]) the dog's fixation on his master (Thomas Mann) and its behaviour towards fellow dogs is dealt with. The fifth and final chapter ("The Hunting-Ground" [""]) is the longest one: In it a visit to a veterinary clinic and various hunts are described.

Reception and interpretation 
The narrative was generally well received. Many – including Konrad Lorenz – remarked upon the excellent analysis of a dog's soul and praised the description of the animal's character. In an academic paper, his son Michael interpreted the narrative allegorically: One could turn left and engage with civilisation or go right into idyllic timelessness. Furthermore, Michael Mann saw elements of parody in it when the idealised nature "on the right" was described in a re-markedly ugly fashion. For Michael Mann this marked a turning point in his father, who still yearned for romantic nature but began to see its dark side which would later lead to "romantic barbarism", a stand-in for the upcoming German Nazism.

Nevertheless, Mann's narrative has also received criticism: Frank Braun remarked that "no more than Churchill’s fame rests on his paintings, or Einstein’s on his playing the violin, does Thomas Mann’s literary stature rest on this charming canine idyl." Harshly critical, Peter Handke pointed out that the narrative was written by Thomas Mann in the knowledge that the author was, in fact, Thomas Mann, and that he was a bad writer for it ("").

Bauschan 

The fictional dog Bauschan (or in English: Bashan), whose deeds are being told in this narrative, really existed as a dog of the Mann family. This can clearly be seen in the diaries of Thomas Mann and is also confirmed in a 1922 letter called "An Jack [To Jack]", where Thomas Mann affirmed that the fictional and the real Bauschan were identical. This letter has been translated into English.

The name of the fictional and real Bauschan is taken from Fritz Reuter's novel From My Farming Days and is probably a corruption of Bastian. Bauschan is one of two dogs owned by Mann that became protagonists in his works; the other was his collie Motz (1905–1915), the model for the fictional dog Perceval (Percy) in Royal Highness.

The Manns got the dog by an arrangement with the proprietress (Anastasia Halder) of the Café Kogler in Bad Tölz. The dog is said to have had a particularly patriarchal instinct, was naive, resilient and in touch with nature, like idealised common folk.

In the winter of 1919/1920, signs of illness in Bauschan became apparent. Thomas Mann noted in his diary entry for Christmas Day 1919:

On 26 December 1919, Bauschan was taken to a veterinary clinic by the author's children Erika and Klaus Mann. But to no avail: On 16 January 1920, Bauschan was euthanized and Thomas Mann picked a verse by August von Platen-Hallermünde as his epitaph.

Adaptation

Film 
 1963: Herr und Hund: Germany 1963. Director: Caspar van den Berg

Audio book 
 : Herr und Hund narrated by Will Quadflieg

References

Citations

Sources

Further reading 
 
 
 

Novels about dogs
German-language literature
Novellas by Thomas Mann
1919 German novels